The Faculty of Architecture is one of nine faculties at the RWTH Aachen University. It comprises 22 chairs and institutes including art history, structural design or load carrying construction. The Faculty was found in 1880. Approximately 1,500 students are enrolled in the faculty.

Degrees awarded

The following Degrees are awarded in architecture, urban management, art history or building history:

 Bachelor of Science
 Master of Science
 Diplom
 Magister
 Doctor

External links
 Faculty of Architecture (English version)

RWTH Aachen University
Architecture schools in Germany